The Don's Analyst is an American television film that starred Robert Loggia, and premiered on Showtime on September 6, 1997. It predated the very similarly plotted 1999 movie Analyze This.

Plot
Don Vito Leoni, the Godfather, is clinically depressed. The world has changed and he hasn't. He'd like to retire, but if he left the "family business" to his two idiot sons, they'd be dead in a minute. So he decides to go legit, which convinces everyone that he must be completely off the deep end. To preserve their cushy lives, his dysfunctional family conspires to get him some psychotherapy. So his boys kidnap a "paisan" shrink, and order him to "fix" their father.

Cast
 Robert Loggia as Don Vito Leoni
 Rick Aiello as Frankie Leoni
 Robert Cicchini as Donnie Leoni
 Howard Jerome as Tomaso
 Louis Di Bianco as Salvatore
 David Calderisi as Anthony
 Lou Pitoscia as Tommy The Rope
 George Santino as Paul Tondini
 Angie Dickinson as Victoria Leoni
 Kevin Pollak as Dr. Julian Riceputo
 Lucy Webb as Dr. Susan Riceputo
 Joe Flaherty as Dr. Lowell Royce
 David Bolt as Dr. Jack Schweigert
 Sherilyn Fenn as Isabella Leoni
 Paulo Costanzo as Young Vito Leoni
 Daniel DeSanto as Young Vincent DeMarco
 Joseph Bologna as Vincent DeMarco
 Peter Blais as Dr. Byron Frohlich
 Philip Akin as Dr. Lusting

References

External links
 
 
 

1997 films
National Lampoon films
American television films
1997 comedy films
1990s English-language films